Schiavo is an Italian surname and may refer to:

Maria Grazia Schiavo, Italian operatic soprano
Mary Schiavo, former Inspector General of the United States Department of Transportation
Tomaso Schiavo, Venetian captain
Terri Schiavo case, surrounding the woman whose medical condition garnered much media attention
The much-publicized Schiavo memo

See also
Schiavone